The 2018–19 Bowling Green Falcons women's basketball team represents Bowling Green State University during the 2018–19 NCAA Division I women's basketball season. The Falcons, led by first year head coach Robyn Fralick, play their home games at the Stroh Center as members of the East Division of the Mid-American Conference. They finished the season 9–21, 2–16 in MAC play to finish in last place in the East Division. They lost in the first round of the MAC women's tournament to Kent State.

Roster

Schedule

|-
!colspan=9 style=| Non-conference regular season

|-
!colspan=9 style=| MAC regular season

|-
!colspan=9 style=| MAC Women's Tournament

See also
2018–19 Bowling Green Falcons men's basketball team

References

2018–19 Mid-American Conference women's basketball season
2017-18
2018 in sports in Ohio
2019 in sports in Ohio